The men's 50 kilometres walk event at the 1998 Commonwealth Games was held on 21 September in Kuala Lumpur. This was the first time this distance was held at the Commonwealth Games, together with 20 kilometres walk replacing the 30 kilometres walk event.

The race was led by Craig Barrett of New Zealand until one kilometre before the finishing line when he collapsed from dehydration. Govindasamy Saravanan from Malaysia went on to win gaining his country's first ever Commonwealth Games gold medal in athletics.

Results

References

50
1998